The Arunachal Pradesh football team is an Indian football team representing Arunachal Pradesh in the Indian state football competitions including the Santosh Trophy. Arunachal's sub-juniors team was runner up in the 2018 Hero Sub-Juniors Boys' National Championship and the 2019 Hero Sub Juniors Girls' National Championship. In the tournament, Tallo Ana from the Apatani community of Arunachal Pradesh was the top scorer with 15 goals in five matches.

Squad
The following 20 players were called for the 2022–23 Santosh Trophy.

Honours
 Mir Iqbal Hussain Trophy
 Runners-up (2): 2018–19, 2019–20

References

Football in Arunachal Pradesh
Santosh Trophy teams